Kuchesfahan District is a district (bakhsh) in Rasht County, Gilan Province, Iran. At the 2006 census, its population was 49,278, in 14,262 families.  The District has one city: Kuchesfahan.  The District has three rural districts (dehestan): Belesbeneh Rural District, Kenar Sar Rural District, and Luleman Rural District.

Kuchesfahan District borders Lasht-e Nesha District to the north, Sangar District to the south, Sepid Rud river to the east and the Central District of Rasht County to the west.

References 

Rasht County
Districts of Gilan Province